1999 Korean FA Cup, known as the 1999 Sambo Computer FA Cup, was the fourth edition of the Korean FA Cup.

Bracket

First round

Round of 16

Quarter-finals

Semi-finals

Final

Awards

See also
1999 in South Korean football
1999 K League
1999 Korean League Cup
1999 Korean League Cup (Supplementary Cup)

References

External links
Official website
Fixtures & Results at JoinKFA

1999
1999 in South Korean football
1999 domestic association football cups